Prestoea acuminata var. montana (vernacular English: Sierran palm; vernacular Spanish: palma de sierra) is a perennial palm in the family Arecaceae.

Description
A palm with a thin and tall stipe and a uniform diameter, reaching heights of 45 feet.

Distribution
It is found throughout the Greater Antilles as well as the Lesser Antilles of the Caribbean.

Habitat
It grows in the forest of creeks in the mountains, and on the steep slopes of the highest peaks in Puerto Rico. It is also found in Toro Negro State Forest, in the Puerto Rico Cordillera Central. According to studies in the Luquillo Mountains, this palm also is associated with landslides.

Uses
The fruit is the favorite food of the Puerto Rican parrot.

Taxonomy
The plant was first described as Euterpe montana and was later transferred to the genus Prestoea.

Etymology
Prestoea: generic name in honor of Henry Prestoe (1842–1923), English botanist and traveler, who collected the plant in Trinidad.
montana: from the Latin, meaning "from the mountain".

Gallery

References

Bibliography
 Anonymous. 1986. List-Based Rec., Soil Conservation Service, U.S.D.A. Database of the U.S.D.A., Beltsville.
 T. J. Killeen, E. García Estigarribia & S. G. Beck. (eds.) 1993. Guía Árb. Bolivia 1–958. Herbario Nacional de Bolivia & Missouri Botanical Garden. Editorial Quipus srl., La Paz, Bolivia. 1993.

External links

acuminata var. montana
Flora of the Caribbean
Flora without expected TNC conservation status